Larry Abia Sila (born 8 August 1993) is a Spanish-born Equatoguinean professional basketball player who plays for LEB Plata club CP La Roda and the Equatorial Guinea national team.

Profile and personal life
Abia was born in Valencia to Equatoguinean Bubi parents. He is a cousin of former handballer Davis Davis.

Professional career
Abia is a product of Valencia Basket. Later, he played for Básquet Coruña.

International career
Abia joined the Equatorial Guinea national basketball team in January 2020. He had previously competed for Spain at under–20 level.

References

External links
 Larry Abia at ACB.com
 Larry Abia - Video highlights

1993 births
Living people
Citizens of Equatorial Guinea through descent
Equatoguinean men's basketball players
Small forwards
 People of Bubi descent
Spanish men's basketball players
Sportspeople from Valencia
Spanish sportspeople of Equatoguinean descent
Spanish people of Bubi descent
Liga ACB players
Valencia Basket players
Básquet Coruña players